Arianna is a  full-displacement luxury megayacht designed and built by Delta Marine Group. Delivered in June 2012, Arianna has a  beam,  of living space, and more than 822 gross tonnage (ITC), which makes Arianna the world's largest volume 50 m yacht (most yachts of this LOA are maxed at 500 tons). Arianna is equipped with twin Caterpillar 3512B engines that give her a cruising speed of 14.5 knots and a maximum speed of 16 knots.

Arianna's interior was designed by Delta Design Group in Seattle, Washington. Her interior is based on a Polynesian theme and is adorned with rare tropical hardwoods including Makassar Ebony, wenge, and koa, an antique Doettling safe, colorful blown glass lighting, as well as a Balinese inspired solid slab dining table.

History 
Ariannas build began in July 2009, exactly three years before her delivery date. Ariannas launch was announced in April 2012. Arianna made her world debut at the Fort Lauderdale International Boat Show on October 25, 2012. Her marketing includes a fully interactive virtual tour  of the yacht, an innovative web site, and appearances in Times Square.

As of December 2012, Arianna was featured in over 100 magazines, publications and websites including covers on ShowBoats International, Revista Yates, Super Yacht Industry, Boats International, Invictus Magazine, Yachts Russia, SuperYacht World, and Yachting Russia.

In 2013, the Arianna appeared in a video for "Sexy People", also known as "The Fiat Song", by rapper Pitbull, featuring Italian singer Arianna Bergamaschi. Arianna has been rumored to be owned by international financier and entrepreneur, Dovi Frances.

Specifications and Features

References

External links 
www.my-arianna.com M/Y Arianna Official Web site
tour.my-arianna.com M/Y Arianna Official Virtual Tour
www.deltamarine.com Delta Marine
Arianna Bergamaschi

Motor yachts
2012 ships
Ships built in Washington (state)